Dangin may refer to:

 Dangin, Western Australia, Australia
 Pascal Dangin (21st century), French digital artist

See also
Dangin-dong
Thureau-Dangin (disambiguation)